Crocco is an Italian surname. Notable people with the surname include:

 Carmine Crocco (1830–1905), also known as Donatello and Italian guerrilla head
 Claudio Crocco (born 1958), former Argentine footballer 
 Gaetano Arturo Crocco (1877–1968), Italian mathematician and space scientist
 Mario Crocco (born 1926), Italo-Argentinian neurobiologist
 Matt Crocco (born 1971), American musician, writer, and producer
 Luigi Crocco (1909-1986), Italo-American mathematician and space engineer

See also
 Crocco (crater), a lunar crater so named to honor Gaetano Crocco
 10606 Crocco, asteroid of the Solar system so named to honor Gaetano Crocco
 Crocco Grand Tour, a spaceship's interplanetary trajectory
 Crocco's theorem, a fluid dynamics theorem by Italian scientist Luigi Crocco
 Elevator Magenta-Crocco, public elevator in the Castelletto quarter of Genoa, Italy

Italian-language surnames